Uzbekistan elects on the national level a head of state – the president – and a legislature. The president is elected for a five-year term by the people. The Supreme Assembly (Oliy Majlis) has 150 members in the Legislative Chamber, elected for a five-year terms and 100 members in the Senate; 84 members elected at the sessions of district, regional and city deputies, and 16 members appointed by the president. Most parties are excluded.
Uzbekistan is a state dominated by the supporters of a head of state – the president. Opposition parties are allowed, but are widely considered to have no real chance of gaining power.

Uzbekistan had the highest voting age in the world, at 25. It has since been lowered to 18 in line with international norms

Latest elections

Presidential election

Parliamentary election

See also
 Electoral calendar
 Electoral system

References

External links
Adam Carr's Election Archive